is a Japanese manga written by Yuya Kurokami and illustrated by Karuna Kanzaki. The series was serialized in Kadokawa's Monthly Shōnen Ace magazine from March 2014 to June 2022. An anime television series adaptation from the manga created by Silver Link and Connect aired from April 2017 to June 2017.

Plot
Fudo Nomura is a young man who was recently expelled from his old high school as a result of a massive, violent brawl. He wants a normal life, but the new school he transferred to is Private Aichi Symbiosis Academy, where the female students have been violently oppressing their male classmates ever since the school became co-ed. A five-member vigilante group called the "Supreme Five Swords" led by Rin Onigawara holds Nomura at sword-point to concede to the rules or leave the school. At this point, Nomura challenges the Supreme Five Swords for his own right and prove true morality despite the brutal force.

Characters

A student who has only recently transferred to Aiichi, Nomura desires freedom and dislikes being forced to do things against his will. During a huge brawl, he managed to defeat 40 people and was then expelled from his previous school and was forcefully transferred to the Private Aiichi Symbiosis Academy. He uses knife-proof gloves and his signature technique is the Spirit Bullet, a powerful palm-strike. He makes it his goal to collect the stamps from the Supreme Five Swords. He is an orphan and doesn't remember his parents. He originally practices the Jigen-ryū style of swordsmanship but eventually gives up on using the sword due to the damage inflicted in his body during sword practices. 

Rin is a renowned sword wielder and leader the Supreme Five Swords. She wears an oni mask due to her terrible childhood and is also known for being merciless to the point that most transfer students in her class quit school. She holds feelings for Nomura after accidentally kissing each other and started watching after him instead of correcting him. She is now covering only her right eye instead of the face after Nomura changes her view about herself and relieved her inner heart. She practices the Japanese Swordsmanship style of Kashima Shinden Jikishinkage-ryū. 

A well endowed French-Japanese student and a member of the Supreme Five Swords, Mary is well versed in western style fencing, accurately piercing central nerves with her rapier. After her fight with Nomura, she seems to have gained some feelings for him after failing to coax him into touching her breasts. She become the second person to get close on Nomura but instead quarrelling with Rin on watching over Nomura. Whenever she gets flustered or excited, she tends to revert to speaking French. She is also have a perverted mind to let Nomura touch her body whenever she does things wrong to him but quickly rejected by Nomura, making her disappointed. 

One of the Supreme Five Swords (Tenka Goken) at The Private Aichi Academy. She blackmailed Nomura to defeat him but instead was defeated herself. After the brawl with Nomura, she started to have interest in him and calls him Nomura-chan instead of his full name. She is a practitioner of swordsmanship style of Keishi-ryū Kidachi Kata, which consists of 10 kata from 10 different kenjutsu schools and is officially taught to Japanese Police Officers.

She is a member of the Supreme Five Swords who has a pet bear named Kyoubou and later a pet cub, Domou. After Nomura had defeated Mary and Rin, she organised 'Waralimpics', an event to correct students, in her master plan to correct Mary, Rin and ultimately Nomura, but failed. She then organised her followers to execute the emergency plan and invites Nomura to meet her on the rooftop. She, Kyoubou and her closest followers were defeated by Nomura, Rin and Mary. She later helped Nomura as his new friend to get him into the girl's dormitory in order to find Satori after Nomura found himself at a disadvantage from Satori's blackmailing plans. She is a practitioner of the Japanese Swordsmanship style of Taisha-ryū.

A middle school girl prodigy who skipped a grade. She is blind and is the strongest of the Five. She is an expert at iaido. She and Nomura studied a similar style of swordsmanship, while Nomura practices the Jigen-ryu, Tsukuyo practices its descendant style, the Yakumaru Jigen-ryū. Even though using the same sword style, Tsukuyo still managed to overpowered him with her fully mastered sword skills. Days after Kirukiru Amou getting expelled, Inaba had made Nomura to become her disciple to further increase his Spirit Bullet's power. 

A transfer student who has been sent to Private Aiichi Symbiosis Academy for being the boss of a gang that was involved in a huge brawl. She later became known as "Empress" after single-handedly defeating two of the Supreme Five Swords, Rin and Mary. Before being transferred, she fought against Nomura which he suffer bad injuries and get hospitalized. Amou falls in love with Nomura after being defeated by him in a one-on-one battle, when he declined to be her subordinate. She gets very jealous when she saw Nomura get too close with the Supreme Five Sword members. After the row with the Supreme Five Sword and Nomura, she befriended Nomura and was expelled from Aichi Academy and gets forcefully transferred to Private Hokkai Symbiosis Academy. She is a practitioner of Karate, specifically the Uechi-ryu Karate.

Rin's freshman and second in-command.

Mary's freshman and second in-command. She's actually Japanese and wears a wig and contact lenses to change her appearance to resemble that of a westerner.

One of Nomura and Rin's classmates.

One of Nomura and Rin's classmates.

One of Warabi's musketeers, she uses a range of iron as a weapon.

She is one of Warabi's Musketeers, she uses two truncheons as weapons. She also has a pencil to write on her notepad.

A student a Aichi Private Academy who resembles an adolescent boy. She often shown wearing sunglasses and an exercise jersey.

Hanasaka's pet bear. It seemed to have affection for Nomura after being defeated by Nomura twice. It bore a cub, Doumo.

She is the elder twin sister of Satori. Her real name is Satori, when children, "Misogi" decided to be Satori, and "Satori" eventually became "Misogi". Misogi stole Satori's identity making everyone in their family believe that she was Satori and vice versa, stealing the real Satori's birthright as the successor of their family's sword school. Now "Misogi" follows "Satori's" shadow, unconditionally loving her monstrous sister.

One of the male students in Aichi Academy. Like the rest of the male student (except for Nomura), he wears makeup as a means to co-exist with the female students in the academy. He is also Nomura's roommate and his first friend. 

The governor of Aiichi and Tsukuyo's older half-sister. She was the one who assigned Tsukuyo to watch over Nomura.

Headmistress of the school and the butler and bodyguard of Koharu Narukami.

She is the mother of the female dormitory, she takes care of Tsukuyo on Koharu's warrant.

It is the youngest son of Kyoubou, he appears to be great at hiding.

He's a friend of Fudou from his previous school. Fudou held out his hand to him, Dousetsu amiably invited him to stroll through the school. Kirukiru out of jealousy, pounded his face, incapacitating him from standing up. It is later revealed that Fudou's motive for wanting to be free to leave Aichi Private was to see if Dousetsu was well.

He is one of Kusuo's colleagues, he is always seen next to Hiko. He, Hiko and Kusuo, are the narrators in the final credits of the episodes.

He is the friend of Omugi, like all other male students, he coexists with the rules of the school. Hiko and Kusuo, are the narrators of the final extras of the episodes.

Media

Manga
Artist Karuna Kanzaki and writer Yuya Kurokami launched the series in the May 2014 issue of Kadokawa Shoten's shōnen manga magazine Monthly Shōnen Ace on March 25, 2014. The series ended in the August 2022 issue published on June 24, 2022. The first three chapters were later made available on the ComicWalker website. The series has been compiled into thirteen tankōbon volumes to date.

Anime
In May 2016, series illustrator Karuna Kanzaki tweeted that there would be an "important announcement" concerning the series in the August issue of Monthly Shōnen Ace on June 26, 2016. On June 19, 2016, Kadokawa announced that the series would receive an anime adaptation, which will be animated by Silver Link and Connect. The anime was directed by Hideki Tachibana and written by Kento Shimoyama. The character designs are handled by Shoko Takimoto and the music is composed by Hiromi Mizutani from Team-MAX. It aired from April 2017 to June 2017. An original video animation was released with the manga's 7th volume on November 25, 2017. Sentai Filmworks has licensed the series in North America. MVM Films released the series in the United Kingdom.

Reception
The fourth volume of the series appeared on the Oricon manga charts at 49th place, selling 16,180 copies.

References

External links
  at Monthly Shōnen Ace 
  at Kadokawa Shoten 
 
 

2017 anime television series debuts
2014 manga
Action anime and manga
Anime Strike
Comedy anime and manga
Connect (studio)
Kadokawa Shoten manga
Kadokawa Dwango franchises
Sentai Filmworks
Shōnen manga
Silver Link